Arshad Ali (born 6 April 1976) is a former Pakistani-born cricketer who played for the United Arab Emirates national cricket team.

Ali was born in Sialkot, Pakistan. He was taught cricket by his brother Shafiq Ahmed, who moved to the UAE in 1991. He subsequently followed his brother to Dubai and excelled in local domestic cricket, winning an award as the Dubai Cricket Council's best junior player. He reportedly scored 35 centuries in six years in local tournaments through to 2001. He is the uncle of Shafiq's son, Pakistan international Abdullah Shafique.

Ali represented the UAE at the 2001 ICC Trophy in Canada, notably scoring a century against Ireland. He was named man of the match in the final of the 2002 ACC Trophy after taking 4/24 against Nepal. He made his One Day International (ODI) debut for the UAE against India at the 2004 Asia Cup. He played three further ODI's, one more at the 2004 Asia Cup and two at the 2008 Asia Cup, with a highest score of 41 against Bangladesh in 2008.

In the opening match of the 2006 ACC Trophy, Ali scored 213 not out against Brunei to lead the UAE to a 367-run win. His highest score in first-class cricket was 185 against Bermuda in the 2007–08 ICC Intercontinental Cup. Only two weeks later, he took career-best List A figures of 7/41 against Denmark in 2007 ICC World Cricket League Division Two.

In 2010, Ali took 3/7 against English county team Sussex in the final of the Emirates Airline Twenty20, leading the Emirates XI to an unlikely 14-run victory defending a total of 85. His final match for UAE was against Canada in 2013 during the ICC World Cricket League Championship.

References

External links
 

1976 births
Emirati cricketers
United Arab Emirates One Day International cricketers
Pakistani emigrants to the United Arab Emirates
Pakistani expatriate sportspeople in the United Arab Emirates
Living people
Pakistani cricketers
Cricketers from Sialkot